Emfue Diatta is a Senegalese politician, and member of the Pan-African Parliament.

References

Year of birth missing (living people)
Living people
Members of the Pan-African Parliament from Senegal
Place of birth missing (living people)
21st-century Senegalese politicians